Guy Yearwood (born 9 November 1948) is an Antiguan cricketer. He played in eight first-class matches for the Leeward Islands from 1970 to 1975.

See also
 List of Leeward Islands first-class cricketers

References

External links
 

1948 births
Living people
Antigua and Barbuda cricketers
Leeward Islands cricketers